Albany is an unincorporated community in Ray County, in the U.S. state of Missouri and part of the Kansas City metropolitan area.

History
Albany was laid out in 1854, and most likely was named after Albany, New York. A variant name was "Ada". A post office called Ada was established in 1864, and remained in operation until 1873.

References

Unincorporated communities in Ray County, Missouri
Unincorporated communities in Missouri